Shoot the Moon is the fourth EP by the American punk rock band Pinhead Gunpowder. It was released on March 30, 1999 through Adeline Records. It was re-released on CD and vinyl through Recess Records on February 12, 2010. It was re-leased on vinyl in 2022 by 1, 2, 3, 4 Go! Records. As of 2022, it is unavailable on major streaming services.

Track listing

Personnel
 Aaron Cometbus – drums
 Billie Joe Armstrong – guitar, vocals
 Jason White – guitar, vocals
 Bill Schneider – bass, backing vocals

Production
 Billie Joe Armstrong - producer
 Ramón Bretón - mastering
 Aaron Cometbus - graphic design, artwork
 Bill Schneider - photography

Notes

References

1999 EPs
Pinhead Gunpowder albums
Adeline Records EPs